The 2002 season of the Ukrainian Championship was the 11th season of Ukraine's women's football competitions. The championship ran from 15 April to 23 August 2002.

As the previous season, the clubs were set in two groups with the top two from each contesting the title in championship round robin tournament.

Teams

Team changes

Name changes
 Donchanka Donetsk changed its name to Metalurh-Donchanka Donetsk.
 Kharkivianka Kharkiv changed its name to FC Kharkiv before the final group tournament.

First stage

Group West

Group East

Finals

References

External links
WFPL.ua
Women's Football.ua

2002
2001–02 in Ukrainian association football leagues
2002–03 in Ukrainian association football leagues
Ukrainian Women's League
Ukrainian Women's League